Attur also spelled as Athur or Authoor or Athoor may also refer to:

India

Tamil Nadu
 Attur, Salem, is a city in Salem District, Tamil Nadu, India
 Athur, Thoothukudi, a town in Thoothukudi District, Tamil Nadu, India
 Athur, Kanniyakumari, a town in Kanyakuamri District, Tamil Nadu, India
 Athoor, a village in Dindugal District, Tamil Nadu, India
 Attur (state assembly constituency)
 Attur Taluk, Salem, a Taluk in Tamil Nadu, India
 Attur block, Dindigul, a revenue block in the Dindigul district
 Attur block, a revenue block in the Salem district
 Attur division, a revenue division in the Salem district

Karnataka
 Attur, Virajpet (also spelled as Atthur), in Virajpet Taluk of Kodagu District
 Attur, Somwarpet (also spelled as Attur Nallur), in Somwarpet Taluk of Kodagu District
 Attur-kemral in Mangalore Taluk of Dakshina Kannada District
 Attur, Udupi, in Karkal Taluk of Udupi District

See also
 Athura, an Assyrian province of the Persian empire
 At-Tur ("The Mount"), the 52nd sura of the Qur'an
 At-Tur (Mount of Olives), an Arab majority neighborhood on the Mount of Olives in East Jerusalem